The Elevator is a made-for-television suspense film that first aired on February 9, 1974 as an ABC Movie of the Week.

Plot
An elevator carrying a diverse group of people and stuck between floors in a high-rise office building. The tension inside the stalled elevator is exacerbated by one passenger: a claustrophobic armed robber trying to flee from his latest hit.

Main cast

Production
The film was made for the ABC Suspense Movie of the Week. It was shot at the Crocker Bank Building in downtown Los Angeles in November 1973.

Reception
The Los Angeles Times called it a "witty and suspenseful diversion".

References

External links
The Elevator at IMDb
Review at Made for TV Mayhem
Elevator at Letterbox DVD

ABC Movie of the Week
1974 television films
1974 films
Films directed by Jerry Jameson